The 2010 U.S. Senior Open was a senior major golf championship and the 31st U.S. Senior Open, held from July 29 to August 1 at Sahalee Country Club in Sammamish, Washington. It was the first U.S. Senior Open played at the course.

World Golf Hall of Fame member Bernhard Langer won by three strokes over Seattle native Fred Couples. The 2010 event was Langer's second senior major championship victory in as many weeks.

Venue

The 2010 event was the first U.S. Senior Open played at Sahalee Country Club.

Course layout

Field
The field consisted of 156 competitors: 127 professionals and 29 amateurs. 18-hole stroke play qualifying rounds were held at several locations for players who were not already exempt.

Past champions in the field

Made the cut

Missed the cut

Round summaries

First round
Thursday, July 29, 2010

Bruce Vaughan posted a four-under-par 66 on day one to lead by two strokes.

Second round
Friday, July 30, 2010

2010 Senior Open champion Bernhard Langer shot a 68 (−2) to take a two shot lead over Tommy Armour III, John Cook, and J. R. Roth.

Third round
Saturday, July 31, 2010

Seattle native Fred Couples shot a five-under-par 65 in the third round to enter the final round at 205 (−5). Bernhard Langer shot a second consecutive round of 68 (−2) to share the 54-hole lead with Couples.

Amateurs: Jackson (+11), Hudson (+16), Grace (+19)

Final round
Sunday, August 1, 2010

Fred Couples birdied the par-4 1st hole to take a one stroke lead over Bernhard Langer. On the par-5 2nd hole, Couples drove his tee shot into the first cut of rough and was left with 227-yards for his second shot. He decided to lay up short of a water hazard which surrounds the front of the second green and was left with 69-yards for his third shot. Couples' third shot found the water and resulted in a triple bogey. Langer made a long birdie putt on the 2nd green to take a three shot lead over Couples. He extended his lead to four strokes with a birdie on the par-4 6th hole. After two late birdies by Couples, Langer entered the 72nd hole with a two stroke lead and converted a 7-foot par putt to win his second consecutive senior major championship by three strokes.

Source:
Amateurs: Jackson (+11), Grace (+25), Hudson (+27)

Scorecard

Cumulative tournament scores, relative to par

Source:

Notes and references

External links
Results at USGA website
Results at PGA Tour website

Senior major golf championships
U.S. Senior Open
Golf in Washington (state)